Himantarioidea is a monophyletic superfamily of soil centipedes in the suborder Adesmata containing the families Oryidae, Himantariidae, and Schendylidae (including Ballophilidae). It's characterized by labrum fringed by marginal denticles, epipharynx with clusters of spear-shaped sensilla on the clypeal part, and telopodites of the second maxillae with a distally flattened pretarsus.

References 

Geophilomorpha
Arthropod superfamilies